"Avant qu'elle parte" (English: "Before she leaves") is a song by the French rap group Sexion d'Assaut released on January 5, 2012. From the studio album L'Apogée, the song was written by Barack Adama, Black M, Gims, Lefa, JR O Crom, Maska, Doomams and Stan E produced by Wati B and Edit by Five copyright bank represented by Akad Daroul.

On April 22, "Avant elle parte" sold 114,179 copies. The video clip was released on March 14, 2012 on the YouTube video sharing site on the Sexion d'Assaut account. The track was awarded the Grand prix Sacem and was voted best Francophone Song of the Year at the NRJ Music Awards.

Awards

Track listing 
 Promo - Digital music spote
 Avant qu'elle parte – 4:34

Charts

Certifications

References 

2012 songs
Songs written by Gims